Union Pacific is a 1939 American Western drama directed by Cecil B. DeMille and starring Barbara Stanwyck, Joel McCrea and Robert Preston. Based on the 1936 novel Trouble Shooter by Western fiction author Ernest Haycox, the film is about the building of the eponymous railroad across the American West. Haycox based his novel upon the experiences of civil engineer Charles H. Sharman, who worked on the railroad from its start in Omaha, Nebraska in 1866 until the golden spike ceremony on May 10, 1869 to commemorate the joining of the Central Pacific and Union Pacific railroads at Promontory Summit, Utah Territory. The film recreates the event using the same 1869 golden spike, on loan from Stanford University.

Plot
The 1862 Pacific Railroad Act signed by President Lincoln authorizes pushing the Union Pacific Railroad westward across the wilderness toward California, but financial opportunist Asa Barrows hopes to profit from obstructing it. Chief troubleshooter Jeff Butler has his hands full fighting Barrows' agent, gambler Sid Campeau. Campeau's partner Dick Allen is Jeff's war buddy and rival suitor for engineer's daughter Molly Monahan.

Cast

Production
According to a news item in The Hollywood Reporter, DeMille directed much of the film from a stretcher because of an operation that he had undergone months earlier. However, studio records indicate that DeMille collapsed from the strain of directing three units simultaneously, and used a stretcher for about two weeks.

Parts of the film were shot in Iron Springs, Utah.

The golden spike used at the ceremony to mark the end of the construction was the same spike actually used in the May 10, 1869 event, on loan from Stanford University.

For the Indian attack on the train, Paramount hired 100 Navajo Indian extras and rented many Pinto horses. Cowboys were hired to round up the horses as they would scatter and sometimes stampede because of the noise and confusion of the production.

To operate the number of trains required by the production, Paramount secured a regulation railroad operating license from the Interstate Commerce Commission.

Awards
The film won the first-ever Palme d'Or at the Cannes Film Festival, although awarded retrospectively at the 2002 festival. The festival was to debut in 1939 but was canceled because of World War II. The organizers of the 2002 festival presented part of the original 1939 selection to a professional jury of six members. The films were: Goodbye, Mr. Chips, La piste du nord, Lenin in 1918, The Four Feathers, The Wizard of Oz, Union Pacific and Boefje.

The film was nominated for an Academy Award for Best Special Effects (Farciot Edouart, Gordon Jennings and Loren L. Ryder) at the 12th Academy Awards.

Historical context
Union Pacific was released in 1939, two months after John Ford's Stagecoach, a film that historians consider responsible for transforming the Hollywood Western from "a mostly low budget, B film affair." Wheeler Dixon notes that after the release of these two films, the Western was "something worthy of adult attention and serious criticism, and therefore a yardstick against which all westerns have been subsequently measured."

DeMille's film indeed brought the genre to a new level, considering issues of national unity in an engaging and entertaining manner at a time when nationalism was an increasing public concern. Author Michael Coyne accordingly characterizes Union Pacific as a "technological nation-linking endeavor" in his book The Crowded Prairie: American National Identity In the Hollywood Western. The spirit of unification in the film parallels the industrial boom that brought the United States out of the Great Depression at the onset of World War II, and although the U.S. would not become involved in the war until 1941, the film’s emphasis on unity typifies the nationalistic sentiment that would strengthen during the war years.

World premiere

The world premiere of the motion picture took place simultaneously at three different theaters (the Omaha, Orpheum and Paramount) in Omaha, Nebraska on April 28, 1939, just three weeks before the 70th anniversary of the driving of the real golden spike that joined the rails of the Union Pacific and the Central Pacific Railroads at Promontory Summit, Utah Territory on May 10, 1869. The premiere was the centerpiece of a four-day event that drew 250,000 people to the city, temporarily doubling its population and requiring the National Guard to help maintain order.

A special train transported DeMille, Stanwyck and McCrea from Hollywood to Omaha. The trip took three days and made stops along the way, drawing large crowds. President Franklin Roosevelt inaugurated the overall celebration by pressing a telegraph key at the White House that opened the civic auditorium. An advertisement stated that the premiere, which involved parades, radio broadcasts and a banquet, was the largest in motion-picture history. An antique train continued on a 15-day coast-to-coast promotional tour, stopping at 30 cities around the country.

Home media
Union Pacific, along with The Sign of the Cross, Four Frightened People, Cleopatra and The Crusades, was released on DVD in 2006 by Universal Studios as part of the Cecil B. DeMille Collection. It was later released separately, as well as on DVD in France and Germany. In 2017, it was released on Blu-ray in Germany by Koch Media with a high-definition transfer of the 107-minute dubbed and edited 1939 German theatrical version.

References

External links

 
 

1939 films
1939 Western (genre) films
American Western (genre) films
Rail transport films
Palme d'Or winners
Paramount Pictures films
Films directed by Cecil B. DeMille
American black-and-white films
Films shot in Utah
1939 drama films
1930s English-language films
1930s American films